Ponomar is an  East Slavic language occupational surname derived from the occupational nickname Ponomar ("sexton"). Notable people with the surname include:

 Andrii Ponomar (born 2002), Ukrainian cyclist
 Lisa Ponomar (born 1997), German tennis player
 Vitaliy Ponomar (born 1990), Ukrainian footballer

See also
 

Occupational surnames
East Slavic-language surnames